Imbi Monorail station is a Malaysian elevated train station on the monorail line that serves as a part of the Kuala Lumpur Monorail (KL Monorail), located in Kuala Lumpur and opened alongside the rest of the train service on August 31, 2003. The station's similar location and proximity to a shopping district as the Bukit Bintang station means that the Imbi station is also one of the most heavily used stations along the KL Monorail line.

Location 

The station is situated in and named after the district of Imbi, directly over Jalan Imbi beside the northeast tip of the Berjaya Times Square shopping center and just east of Plaza Berjaya. Berjaya Times Square was opened two months after the station began operation. The station features a total of five exits: Two exits towards the west of the station lead into Berjaya Times Square and Plaza Berjaya on the opposite side of the road, while the remaining two exits lead eastward onto both sides of Jalan Imbi.

The Imbi station is also within a close range of several more shopping centers near Bukit Bintang, including the Low Yat Plaza, Imbi Plaza, Sungei Wang Plaza, and Pavilion Kuala Lumpur. Because of its location, the station receives a high number of passengers during peak hours and non-working days, although there is no bus connection to this station.

Position within the Kuala Lumpur Monorail system
The station is one of four Kuala Lumpur Monorail stations that serves the Kuala Lumpur Golden Triangle locality, the other three being the Raja Chulan station, the Bukit Bintang station and the Hang Tuah station (connected to the Ampang Line).

Around the station
 Berjaya Times Square
 Low Yat Plaza
 Plaza Berjaya
 Meliá Kuala Lumpur

See also
 List of rail transit stations in Klang Valley

External links

Kuala Lumpur Monorail stations
Railway stations opened in 2003
2003 establishments in Malaysia